Checkpoint Systems is an American company that specializes in loss prevention and merchandise visibility for retail companies. It makes products that allow retailers to check inventory, quicken the replenishment cycle, prevent out-of-stocks and reduce theft. Checkpoint offers Electronic Article Surveillance (EAS) radio frequency solutions for retail, high-theft and loss-prevention solutions, RFID hardware, software, and labeling capabilities.

It is currently a division of CCL Industries, which acquired Checkpoint in 2016.

History
The checkpoint was invented in the United States during the 1960s, when Peter Stern, who was president of the Board of Library Directors in the city of Philadelphia, was deeply concerned about the widespread theft of books from public libraries. He was the leader of a team of researchers working at a privately held converter of paperboard and paper, and believed this was a problem his team could tackle and that a system could be developed to prevent books from being stolen. Thus the CHECKPOINT system was developed and patented.

1977–1998 
The CHECKPOINT system was based on sheets of non-ferrous metal laminated into flexible tags, which reacted with magnetic metal-detection technology housed in a turnstile. Trim and unobtrusive, these paper tags could be attached to book covers. In 1969, Checkpoint Systems was formed as a wholly-owned subsidiary of Logistics Industries Corporation. Eight years later, on June 30, 1977, Checkpoint was spun off from its parent company and began trading on NASDAQ under the symbol CHECK. By then, the company's CHECKPOINT technology was already being adapted for use in retail.
Within the next twenty years, Checkpoint Systems implemented RF electronic article surveillance (EAS) across different stores and in October 1993, the company's common stock began trading on the New York Stock Exchange under the symbol CKP. Its operations expanded through acquisitions, and in the mid-1990s, after purchasing two European systems manufacturers, Checkpoint established direct access to the European market. Its security systems were marketed to retail customers, including drug store chains, hypermarkets, supermarkets, mass merchandisers, discount stores and electronics retailers, as well as libraries in the United States.

1999–2006
In 1999, Checkpoint Systems broadened its product offering with the purchase of METO, a German provider of handheld labeling systems used by food and discount retailers to brand and price mark merchandise. The newly acquired company doubled Checkpoint's revenues and helped to expand relationships with European retailers. Two years later, Checkpoint bought A.W. Printing Inc., a U.S.-based printer of tickets, tags, and labels for apparel retailers and brand owners. This acquisition expanded the company's label printing operations and gave entrée to customers in the soft goods market segment.
By the mid-2000s, Checkpoint had a source tagging program, facilitated by the company's service bureau business. Check-Net®, a web-based platform, started to provide apparel retailers and brand owners with a repository and logistics service to manage all their retail labeling needs. In 2006, Checkpoint further expanded its source tagging business with new print technology and production capabilities through the purchase of ADS Worldwide, a UK-based supplier of apparel labels, tags, and trim products.

Acquisitions (2007–present)
Over the next five years, several acquisitions enabled Checkpoint to extend its offering of merchandise availability applications for retailers: 
 In 2007, Alpha S3. A U.S.-based provider of security products for protecting high-theft merchandise; and SIDEP, a supplier of EAS systems operating in France and China.
 In 2008, Asialco Electronics Company. A China-based manufacturer of RF-EAS labels to meet growing demand in emerging Asian markets.
 Also in 2008, OATSystems. An RFID application software company, founded by Prasad Putta and Dr. Sanjay Sarma (who co-founded the MIT Auto-ID Lab), enabled Checkpoint to provide tracking and inventory management solutions throughout the supply chain.
 In 2009, Brilliant Label Manufacturing Ltd. A China-based manufacturer of apparel labels and tags added more labeling products for the global apparel industry.
 In 2011, Shore to Shore. A global manufacturer of labels and tags for apparel and footwear expanded Checkpoint's production, capabilities, and global reach.
 In 2016, Checkpoint announces a collaboration with Microsoft Corp. to bring their RFID Merchandise Visibility solutions to the cloud, and utilize Microsoft analytical tools.

References

Companies based in Gloucester County, New Jersey
West Deptford Township, New Jersey